1997 Avispa Fukuoka season

Competitions

Domestic results

J.League

Emperor's Cup

J.League Cup

Player statistics

 † player(s) joined the team after the opening of this season.

Transfers

In:

Out:

Transfers during the season

In
Julio Hernán Rossi (on April)
Michael Edirin Obiku (from Real Mallorca on July)
Pablo José Maqueda Andrés (from Real Oviedo on July)
Tomoyasu Ando (loan from Urawa Red Diamonds on September)

Out
Satoshi Tsunami (to Bellmare Hiratsuka)
Carracedo (on June)
Riep (on August)

Awards
none

References
J.LEAGUE OFFICIAL GUIDE 1997, 1997 
J.LEAGUE OFFICIAL GUIDE 1998, 1996 
J.LEAGUE YEARBOOK 1999, 1999

Other pages
 J. League official site
 Avispa Fukuoka official site

Avispa Fukuoka
Avispa Fukuoka seasons